The 1912–13 Cornell Big Red men's ice hockey season was the 12th season of play for the program.

Season
After Harvard had withdrawn from the Intercollegiate Hockey Association in 1911, the league lost both Columbia and Yale before the 1912–13 season. This left the league with just three teams. The final blow came from the formation of the Intercollegiate Hockey League between Harvard, Yale and Princeton, which rendered the IHA superfluous. The IHA would play one final season before dissolving in 1913. Cornell would not be a member of another ice hockey conference until 1961.

On the ice the results for the Big Red were even worse. The offensive punch was still missing and without now-graduated Malcolm Vail to serve as a safety net in goal, the team's goals against ballooned. The team lost every game with only one being remotely close. Former captain Edmund Magner served as coach for the season but after the disastrous results there was little surprise that this was his only season behind the bench.

Roster

Standings

Schedule and results

|-
!colspan=12 style=";" | Regular Season

References

Cornell Big Red men's ice hockey seasons
Cornell
Cornell
Cornell
Cornell